Dilshad Najmuddin (1933 – 18 May 2018) was a senior retired Inspector general of the Police Service of Pakistan. He was educated at the famous Woodstock School near Mussorie, India, during the 1940s and later at the Forman Christian College, Lahore.

During the late 1980s, he also served as the Director of the Pakistan Narcotics Control Board (PNCB). After his retirement from the Pakistani Police, Dr. Najmuddin also served for some time as Pakistan's Ambassador to the Papal See from 1991 onwards.

He died in hospital, in Islamabad, Pakistan, after a brief illness on 18 May 2018.

Najmuddin belonged to the well-known Pakistani Christian Najmuddin family of Lahore, Pakistan   who have run the renowned Joan McDonald schools system in Lahore and Islamabad, since 1921 onwards .

See also
 Holy See-Pakistan relations
 Christianity in Pakistan

References

1937 births
2018 deaths
Pakistani police officers
Pakistani diplomats
Pakistani Christians
People from Lahore
Place of birth missing
Forman Christian College alumni